Mangga Dua Selatan is an administrative village in the Sawah Besar district of Indonesia. It has postal code of 10730.

See also
List of administrative villages of Jakarta

Administrative villages in Jakarta